A total solar eclipse occurred on December 22, 1870. A solar eclipse occurs when the Moon passes between Earth and the Sun, thereby totally or partly obscuring the image of the Sun for a viewer on Earth. A total solar eclipse occurs when the Moon's apparent diameter is larger than the Sun's, blocking all direct sunlight, turning day into darkness. Totality occurs in a narrow path across Earth's surface, with the partial solar eclipse visible over a surrounding region thousands of kilometres wide.
Totality was visible from southern Portugal and Spain, across northern Algeria, then crossing Sicily, Greece, Bulgaria, and ending in the south-west of the Russian Empire.

Observations

Related eclipses 
It is a part of solar Saros 120.

References

 NASA chart graphics
 Googlemap
 NASA Besselian elements
 
 Reports on observations of the total solar eclipse of December 22, 1870 By United States Naval Observatory, Simon Newcomb, Asaph Hall, William Harkness, John Robie Eastman
 Solar Eclipse seen from Jerez in 1870
 The sun was crowned in Jerez

1870 12 22
1870 in science
1870 12 22
December 1870 events